This is a list of the vice-admirals of the western coast (of Scotland).

Vice-admirals of the western coast
Source:
1730–1743 John Campbell, 2nd Duke of Argyll
1744–1761 Archibald Campbell, 3rd Duke of Argyll
1762–1770 John Campbell, 4th Duke of Argyll
1770–1806 John Campbell, 5th Duke of Argyll
1807–1839 George Campbell, 6th Duke of Argyll
1840–1862 John Campbell, 2nd Marquess of Breadalbane
1863–1900 George Campbell, 8th Duke of Argyll

References

Military ranks of the United Kingdom
Vice-Admirals
Western Coast